Willow Springs Township is a township in Douglas County, Kansas, USA.  As of the 2000 census, its population was 1,409.  Willow Springs Township was formed in 1856. It was named after a small watering stop along the Santa Fe Trail.

Geography
According to the USGS, it contains four cemeteries: Bethel, Flory, Sutton and Worden.

The stream of Chicken Creek runs through this township.

Adjacent townships
Clinton Township, Douglas County (northwest)
Wakarusa Township, Douglas County (northeast)
Palmyra Township, Douglas County (east)
Hayes Township, Franklin County (southeast)
Centropolis Township, Franklin County (southwest)
Marion Township, Douglas County (west)

Towns and settlements
Although these towns may not be incorporated or populated, they are still placed on maps produced by the county.

Pleasant Grove, located at 
Willow Springs, located at 
Worden, located at

Transportation

Major Highways
U.S. Highway 56
U.S. Highway 59

Airports
Willow Springs Township contains one airport or landing strip, Flory Airport.

Places of interest
The Old German Baptist Brethren Church built in 1885.  It is one of only 5 in Kansas and 56 in the country.

References

External links
 US-Counties.com
 City-Data.com

Townships in Douglas County, Kansas
Townships in Kansas